WASP-121, also known as CD-38 3220, is a magnitude 10.4 star located approximately 850 light-years away in the constellation Puppis. WASP-121 has a mass and radius similar to the Sun's. 

The star, although metal-rich in terms of overall contents of heavy elements, is depleted of carbon. Carbon to oxygen molar ratio of 0.23 for WASP-121 is well below solar ratio of 0.55.

Planetary system

Its planet WASP-121b orbits around WASP-121 in about 1.27 days. WASP-121b is the first exoplanet found to contain water in an extrasolar planetary stratosphere (i.e., an atmospheric layer in which temperatures increase as the altitude increases).

In 2015, the extrasolar planet WASP-121b was discovered orbiting WASP-121 by the transit method. WASP-121b is a "hot Jupiter" exoplanet with a mass about 1.18 times that of Jupiter and a radius about 1.81 times that of Jupiter. The exoplanet orbits WASP-121, its host star, every 1.27 days. Hot water molecules have been found in the stratosphere of WASP-121b.

In August 2022, this planetary system was included among 20 systems to be named by the third NameExoWorlds project.

Gallery

See also
 List of exoplanet firsts
 List of exoplanets discovered in 2015
 SuperWASP
 WASP-33b

References

External links
 SuperWASP Wide Angle Search for Planets: The Planets, SuperWASP

Puppis
Planetary systems with one confirmed planet
Planetary transit variables
F-type main-sequence stars
J07102406-3905506
CD-38 3220
0495